Olympic FC de Niamey is a Nigerien football club based in Niamey. Their home games are played at Général Seyni Kountché Stadion.  The club was formed in 1974 from  the football club Secteur 6.

Achievements
Niger Premier League: 12
1966, 1967, 1968, 1969, 1970 (as Secteur 6)
1976, 1977, 1978, 1989, 1998, 1999, 2012.

Niger Cup: 5
1975, 1977, 1990, 1991, 2003.

Performance in CAF competitions
CAF Champions League: 1 appearance
2000 – Preliminary Round

 African Cup of Champions Clubs: 9 appearances

1967 – Preliminary Round
1968 – Preliminary Round
1969 – First Round

1970 – First Round
1971 – First Round
1975 – First Round

1977 – First Round
1978 – Second Round
1990 – Preliminary Round

CAF Confederation Cup: 1 appearance
2004 – First Round

CAF Cup: 1 appearance
1994 – Second Round

CAF Cup Winners' Cup: 4 appearances

1991 – Second Round
1992 – Second Round

1993 – First Round

2001 – First Round

Current squad

Football clubs in Niger
Super Ligue (Niger) clubs
Sport in Niamey
Association football clubs established in 1974
1974 establishments in Niger